The Lion King's Timon & Pumbaa, often simply referred to as Timon & Pumbaa, is an American animated buddy comedy television series created by Walt Disney Television Animation. Based on Disney's 1994 animated film The Lion King, it centers on Timon the meerkat and Pumbaa the warthog, as they live their problem-free philosophy "Hakuna Matata". Unlike other The Lion King media, the tone of the series is more slapstick comedy-oriented.

Ernie Sabella reprised his role as Pumbaa for the show's entire run, while Nathan Lane voiced Timon in early episodes.

The show ran for three seasons, with the first two as part of the syndicated The Disney Afternoon block, CBS, and the third season on   Toon Disney. It aired from September 8, 1995 to September 24, 1999. It is notably the first Lion King-related media to feature on-screen appearances by humans, as humans did not appear in the film and the subsequent direct-to-video sequels. It is also the first of two television series to be based on the film, the second being The Lion Guard (2016–2019).

Bobs Gannaway and Tony Craig, who would later work on shows like 101 Dalmatians: The Series, House of Mouse, and Lilo & Stitch: The Series, served as the show's executive producers for the first two seasons. As of Season 3, the series was produced by Chris Bartleman and Blair Peters, with Tedd and Patsy Cameron-Anasti (who have previously worked on DuckTales and The Little Mermaid TV series) serving as the executive producers.

Premise
The show stars Timon, a meerkat, and Pumbaa, a warthog, both characters from the Disney animated film The Lion King. The series is primarily set after the events of the first film, although some episodes are set before or during those events. It involves the characters having misadventures in different settings, including the jungles of Africa, Canada, Italy, Spain, the United Kingdom, and the United States. Whereas the show focuses on Timon and Pumbaa, four episodes center respectively on Rafiki and the hyena trio Shenzi, Banzai, and Ed, named Rafiki Fables and The Laughing Hyenas, and two episodes tell the backstory of Zazu.

Episodes

Characters

Main
 Timon (voiced in early episodes by Nathan Lane, Quinton Flynn, Season 1; Kevin Schon, Seasons 2–3) is one of the show's two main protagonists. Lane reprises his role from The Lion King, while Schon later provided Timon's voice in The Lion Guard.
 Pumbaa (voiced by Ernie Sabella): One of the show's two main protagonists. Sabella reprises his role from The Lion King.

The Lion King alumni
The following characters from The Lion King appear in this series:
Simba (voiced by Cam Clarke) was the protagonist of the original The Lion King film and best friend of Timon and Pumbaa and the son of the late Mufasa, who is now King of the Pride Lands and is occasionally the voice of reason around Timon and Pumbaa's antics. Clarke later provided Simba's singing voice in The Lion King II: Simba's Pride.
Rafiki (voiced by Robert Guillaume) is a wise mandrill who gives good advice. Guillaume reprises his role from The Lion King.
Zazu (voiced by Edward Hibbert) is a pompous hornbill who works for Simba. Hibbert later provided Zazu's voice in The Lion King II: Simba's Pride and The Lion King 1½.
Shenzi, Banzai and Ed (voiced by Tress MacNeille, Rob Paulsen, and Jim Cummings) are three crazy hyenas and Scar's former henchmen who are usually spending their time looking for food, though their attempts to get it tend to backfire, after having killed Scar for his betrayal in the movie, they leave the Elephant Graveyard and now live in a cave at the Outlands. Cummings reprises his role of Ed from The Lion King, with Paulsen and MacNeille replacing Cheech Marin and Whoopi Goldberg as Banzai and Shenzi, respectively.
Gopher (voiced by Jim Cummings) is a mole, and chief lieutenant of Zazu.

Supporting characters
 Speedy (voiced by Corey Burton imitating Bing Crosby) is a laid-back blue snail who can talk and sing. Timon and Pumbaa originally planned to eat him, but ended up becoming friends with him instead. They often find themselves rushing to have to save Speedy from dangerous situations.
 Fred (voiced by S. Scott Bullock) is a maniacal meerkat who is an old friend of Timon. He loves to laugh and play around, as well as pulling practical jokes. He often uses Timon and Pumbaa as his victims, although they don't find his jokes very funny.
 Boss Beaver (voiced by Brad Garrett) is a stereotypical beaver whose life philosophy is the exact opposite of Hakuna Matata. He values hard work and is sometimes too harsh on his employees. He also emphasizes the importance of safe work conditions.
 Irwin (voiced by Charlie Adler) is a dimwitted, accident-prone penguin whose bad luck seems to be terribly contagious. Timon and Pumbaa became his friends after they were stranded in Antarctica and Irwin had two extra tickets to a cruise ship. They will try to avoid him at all costs.

Antagonists
 Quint (voiced by Corey Burton) is Timon and Pumbaa's human archenemy and the main antagonist of the series. He is a man of many disguises and his role varies from episode to episode, from mildly bothersome antagonist to full villain.
 Toucan Dan (voiced by Jeff Bennett) is a criminal toucan, wanted by the police. He is known for being a sly con-artist and always manages to trick Timon and Pumbaa (or just Timon) into helping him in his schemes and cons.
 Cheetata and Cheetato (voiced by Rob Paulsen and Jim Cummings respectively) are a pair of sophisticated cheetahs who hunt for their prey, enemies of Timon and Pumbaa and of Shenzi, Banzai and Ed. Although hard to tell apart, aside from their voices, Cheetata appears to be more eager and aggressive while Cheetato seems more likely to think things through and is the most conniving.
 Smolder (voiced by Jim Cummings) is a large brown bear with a very short temperament who Timon and Pumbaa often run into. He can be quite menacing and dangerous, but at least one episode shows that deep inside he is a nice guy.
 The Three Natives (voiced by Jeff Bennett) are a trio of natives who are really university students. Their "chief" is also a university student, and usually precedes what he says with "Bungala bungala!"
 Little Jimmy (voiced by Joe Alaskey) is a cute yet dangerous bluebird who is a criminal mastermind. He also has two voices: a cute, innocent voice to pass himself off as a hatchling and a gruff voice to prove his true maturity.

History

Production
On January 24, 1995, it was announced that a Lion King television series starring Timon and Pumbaa was set to premiere during the fall, as part of The Disney Afternoon. Gary Krisel, who was then president of Walt Disney Television Animation, found Timon and Pumbaa to be the best new comedy team to come on the scene for a long time and that they had the potential to be just as classic as Abbott and Costello, Hope and Crosby, Martin and Lewis, and Nichols and May.

Bobs Gannaway stated that he and Tony Craig wanted to expand on Timon and Pumbaa's personalities as a comedy team to keep the series fresh and to keep the show interesting, they decided to not have Timon and Pumbaa be locked into the Serengeti, but allow them to explore the world and meet different kinds of animals. According to one of the show's writers Kevin Campbell, at the beginning of the series, he and Gannaway made a giant list of puns using country names to open the doors on how many places they could go. After figuring out which funny animal or obstacle situation Timon and Pumbaa would face, they used a "Which Animals Live Where" atlas reference book to find where in the world an episode could take place and check a list of country puns they could pick.

The show was one of the last Disney productions to air on CBS, which had a cross-promotion agreement with Disney, as Disney bought ABC in 1996, the same year that this show (and all other Disney properties still airing on CBS at the time) left the network. Also, in 1995, Westinghouse acquired CBS outright for $5.4 billion. As one of the major broadcasting group owners of commercial radio and television stations (as Group W) since 1920, Westinghouse proceeded to transform itself from its legendary role as a diversified conglomerate with a strong industrial heritage into a media giant with its purchase of CBS. Music underscore by Stephen James Taylor featuring frequent use of a microtonal xylophone and pan pipes based on an African tribal tuning. 

Animation production was done by a consortium of overseas animation studios, including Walt Disney Animation Australia, Toon City, Wang Film Productions, Thai Wang Film Productions, Rough Draft Korea Co., Ltd., Sunmin Image Pictures Co., Sunwoo Animation, Koko Enterprises, Toonz Animation, Gnome Productions, Jaime Diaz Productions, Project X Animation, Shanghai Morning Sun Animation, Sichuan Top Animation and Studio B Productions.

Broadcast
The first two seasons of the show aired simultaneously on The Disney Afternoon and CBS, whereas the third and final season aired on Toon Disney. Reruns of the series aired on Disney Channel from 1997 to 2008. Reruns were shown on Toon Disney up until the channel's demise on February 8, 2009. As a result, the show went off the air for three years.

On March 23, 2012, the show returned to television when Disney Junior was launched as its own channel. However, only selected episodes were shown and some episodes were abruptly edited (presumably due to scenes being deemed inappropriate for preschoolers). As of 2014, the show was removed from the channel. However in Russia continued air this show until the channel closed in 2022.

Music

Home media

VHS releases

North American releases
Six VHS cassettes containing 18 episodes were released in the United States and Canada under the name Timon & Pumbaa's Wild Adventures. Also in the same two North American countries, a double-feature LaserDisc contains the series' first two volumes, Hangin' with Baby and Grub's On.

International releases
Three VHS cassettes containing 21 episodes were released in Europe, Australia, and New Zealand, each containing six episodes and a music video. These three titles were also released on VHS, LaserDisc and Video CD in Asia, the Middle East, South Africa, and South America. The first VHS release, Around the World with Timon And Pumbaa, features an original story told through bridging sequences in which, after Pumbaa develops amnesia from a lightning strike, Timon tries to restore his friend's memory through the episodes featured on that video.

DVD releases

Three DVDs containing 18 episodes and 3 songs were released in Europe, Australia and New Zealand, and Japan.

Video on demand

United States
The series was made available in its entirety on Disney+ on November 12, 2019, in remastered high definition.

International
The first two seasons of the show was made available on the DisneyLife streaming service in the United Kingdom.

The entire series is currently available for purchase on Amazon Instant Video in Germany.

The series is available in its entirety on Disney+, where the streaming service is available.

Awards and nominations

Other media

Video games

Impact and legacy
Some of the show's crew returned for The Lion King II: Simba's Pride, The Lion King 1½, and The Lion Guard. Show writer Ford Riley went on to develop the latter, and has since been a series creator, writer and lyricist on many Disney properties. Kevin Schon, who voiced Timon in the series as of its second season, reprised his role as the character in The Lion Guard (as well as its pilot film), along with some other related media, such as House of Mouse. Edward Hibbert continued to voice Zazu in the two direct-to-video follow-ups to The Lion King.

Much of the show's staff members (including executive producers Tony Craig and Bobs Gannaway) went on to work on House of Mouse and Lilo & Stitch: The Series.

References in other media
 A scene from the episode "Uganda Be an Elephant" is shown in the 2000 Disney Channel Original Movie Stepsister from Planet Weird.
 The title card artwork for the two Zazu-centered episodes is referenced in the House of Mouse episode "King Larry Swings in".

Notes

References

External links

 Timon & Pumbaa Official Website
 
 

The Lion King (franchise)
1990s American animated television series
1995 American television series debuts
1999 American television series endings
American children's animated adventure television series
American children's animated comedy television series
American children's animated fantasy television series
English-language television shows
First-run syndicated television programs in the United States
The Disney Afternoon
CBS original programming
Comedy franchises
Disney Channel original programming
Disney Junior original programming
Toon Disney original programming
Television series based on Disney films
Animated television shows based on films
Animated television series about mammals
Television shows set in Africa
Television series by Disney Television Animation